Miller Block may refer to:

Miller Block (Tempe, Arizona), formerly listed on the National Register of Historic Places in Maricopa County, Arizona
Miller Block (Cleveland, Ohio), listed on the National Register of Historic Places in Cuyahoga County, Ohio
Miller Block (Spokane, Washington), listed on the National Register of Historic Places in Spokane County, Washington